The 2021 OKC Energy FC season is the club's eighth and final season of existence, and their eight consecutive season in the USL Championship, the second tier of American soccer. The season covers the period from October 3, 2020, to the beginning of the 2022 USLC season. The 2021 season was the second for OKC coach John Pascarella. On June 4, 2021, following a winless start to the 2021 USL Championship season, Pascarella and the OKC Energy mutually agreed to part ways.

Roster

Non-competitive

Preseason

Competitions

USL

Standings

Results summary

Results by round

Match results

Statistics

Appearances and goals

Disciplinary record

Clean sheets

Transfers

Loan in

See also
 OKC Energy FC
 2021 in American soccer
 2021 USL Championship season

References

OKC Energy
OKC Energy
OKC Energy
OKC Energy FC seasons